Elisabeth Caroline "Lise" Simms (born March 17, 1963) is an American actress, singer, designer and dancer.

Biography

Early life
Simms was born in Pueblo, Colorado, to Bill and Jacque Simms, the sixth of nine children. In 1981, she graduated from Pueblo Centennial High School. Her brother, Tom, is a Spanish and Language Arts teacher at Centennial High School.

Career

Broadway and theater
Simms began her acting career at age 13. After graduating from high school, she started acting on Broadway in numerous plays, including Other People's Money, Mame, Can-Can, Sweet Charity and Bye Bye Birdie during the 1980s. She was a member of the original Los Angeles, California cast of Beauty and the Beast and toured around the world with A Chorus Line in 1986.

Television
Simms was the host of Style Network's Area. She had a recurring role on Sunset Beach, but is best known for her role as "Barbara Diffy", Phil's mom in the Disney Channel original series Phil of the Future, where she also played "The Timekeeper" in the episode "It's a Wonder-Phil Life". She had a recurring role as "Connie Wayne" in the soap opera The Young and the Restless and made guest appearances on Friends, Providence, MADtv, 3rd Rock from the Sun, Star Trek: Voyager, iCarly and many others. She performed for President Reagan in 1988's Great Performances at the White House series, which aired on the Public Broadcasting Service.

Simms was a co-host and interior designer on Home & Garden Television's Desperate Spaces. She and co-host and designer Daniel Kucan chose one room of a house and redecorated it in two days with only $2,500. Desperate Spaces premiered on January 1, 2008.

Simms had a guest spot on the February 3, 2009 episode of 90210 as Ty's mother, Louise Collins.

Personal life
As of 2006, Lise lived in the 1941 Hollywood colonial home she renovated. She was married to actor Terry Rhoads until his death in 2013. Rhoads had two children from a previous marriage.  Simms remarried in September 2018 to John Stewart.  They are currently separated and have filed for divorce.

Filmography

Film
 Perry Mason: The Case of the Heartbroken Bride (1992) - female guest
 The Dentist (1996) - Paula Roberts
 The Omega Code (1999) - talk show reporter
 Star Trek: Away Team (2001) - T'Andoria
 Dragonfly (2002) - nephrology desk nurse
 Suits on the Loose (2006) - Christine
 Snow Buddies (2008) - Meg

Television
 Sunset Beach (1997) - Nurse Kathy Baker (1998)
 The Young and the Restless (1973) - Connie Wayne (1999–2004)
 Area (2002) - herself
 Phil of the Future (2004–2006) - Barbara Diffy
 Express Yourself (2001) - herself (2004–05)
 Desperate Spaces (2008) - herself
 The Generations Project - herself/host (2010-current)

Guest appearances
 NCIS (2018) - Kenna Reynolds
 Bones (2013) - Aunt Alice
 90210 (2009) - Louise Collins
 United States of Tara (2009) - Barnabeez Lawyer
 iCarly (2008) - Mrs. Linda Peeloff
 ER (2006) - Emcee
 Night Stalker (2005) - TV Reporter
 Quintuplets (2004) - Coach Allison
 Dragnet  (2003) - Brenda
 My Wife and Kids (2003) - Flight Attendant
 Birds of Prey (2002) - Detective Grace Tanner
 Nikki (2001) - Stephanie
 The Geena Davis Show (2000) - Natalie
 Opposite Sex (2000) - Phil's mom
 Ladies Man (2000) - Shirl Henderson
 Veronica's Closet (2000) - Yoga Instructor
 Providence (1999) - Shelly
 Friends  (1999) - Kara
 The Pretender (1998) - Reporter
 Star Trek: Voyager (1997) - Annorax's wife Episode: "Year of Hell"
 3rd Rock from the Sun (1997) - Gabby
 Sisters (1996) - Female Reporter
 Maybe This Time (1996) - Suzi
 Ellen (1995) - Lesley
 MADtv (1995) - Executive #2
 Love & War (1995) - Female Customer #1

External links

1967 births
American female dancers
American dancers
American film actresses
American women singers
American soap opera actresses
American television actresses
American interior designers
Actresses from Colorado
Living people
21st-century American women